Kolgrov is a village in Solund Municipality in Vestland county, Norway. The village is located on the western coast of the island of Ytre Sula, and it is one of the largest population centres on the island.

Husøy Church is located on the north side of Kolgrov. Historically, the church was located on the island of Utvær until 1719.  It was then moved to the small island of Husøy (just off the coast of Kolgrov). In 1896, the church was moved to its present site.

References

Villages in Vestland
Solund